Rudice is a municipality and village in Blansko District in the South Moravian Region of the Czech Republic. It has about 1,000 inhabitants.

Notable people
Karel Zouhar (1917–1985), fighter pilot

References

Villages in Blansko District